Maharani Laxmi Bai Government College of Excellence, Gwalior or M.L.B. Government College of Excellence, Gwalior is a government college in Gwalior, Madhya Pradesh which is affiliated with Jiwaji University.

History
It was established in 1846 as Lashkar Madarsa, in 1887 name was changed into Victoria College and in 1957 it was renamed after Maharani Laxmi Bai. It was affiliated with University of Calcutta till 1887, from 1887 to 1927 it was affiliated with University of Allahabad, from 1927 to 1957 it was affiliated with Agra University, from 1957 to 1964 it was affiliated with Vikram University and it got its present affiliation with Jiwaji University in 1964.

Notable alumni
Atal Bihari Vajpayee
Dhyan Chand
Roop Singh 
Shivmangal Singh Suman
Kaptan Singh Solanki

References

External links
Official Website

Educational institutions established in 1846

Universities and colleges in Gwalior